The Miss Perú 2000 pageant was held on May 7, 2000. That year, 24 candidates were competing for the national crown. The chosen winners represented Peru at the Miss Universe 2000  and Miss World 2000. The rest of the finalists would enter in different pageants.

Verónica Rueckner was born in Talara, Piura on August 25, 1980.

Placements

Special Awards

 Best Regional Costume - Moquegua - Lucia de Olazabal
 Miss Photogenic - Tumbes - Claudia Neyra
 Miss Elegance - Moquegua - Lucía de Olazabal
 Miss Body - Ancash - Thalía Ibanez
 Best Hair - Lambayeque - Karla Casós
 Miss Congeniality - Cajamarca - Carla Crovetti
 Most Beautiful Face - La Libertad - Maria Inés Cerdena
 Miss Popularity - Tumbes - Claudia Neyra (by votes of readers of GENTE Magazine)

Delegates

Amazonas - Katherine Mayer
Ancash - Thalía Ibañez
Apurímac - Arlette Pomacaja
Arequipa - Patricia Velarde
Cajamarca - Carla Crovetti
Cuzco - Silvana Arias
Distrito Capital - Verónica Maseda
Huancavelica - Analí Calderón
Huánuco - Sandra Urbina
Ica - Natalia Delgado
Junín - María Alicia Acosta 
La Libertad - María Inés Cerdena
Lambayeque - Karla Casós
Loreto - Paola León-Prado
Madre de Dios - Kelly Zapata
Moquegua - Lucía de Olazabal
Pasco - Antuanette Reaño
Piura - Verónica Rueckner
Puno - Luciana Farfán
San Martín - Laura Huarcayo
Tacna - July Lopez
Trujillo - Tatiana Angulo
Tumbes - Claudia Neyra
Ucayali - Ingrid Puente

Judges

 Yukta Mookhey - Miss World 1999	(from India)
 Alberto Andrade - Mayor of Lima
 Acirema Alayeto - President of the Miss Latin America Org.
 Christian Meier - Peruvian Actor & Singer
 Julio Otiniano - Representative of EGO's Spa & Beauty salon
 Luis López Hartinger - Peruvian Olympian Swimmer
 Gisela Valcárcel - Peruvian TV presenter
 Jorge Henderson - Peruvian Journalist & TV presenter
 Jean Pierre Vismara - Mister Peru 1998
 Lucila Boggiano de Zoeger - Mrs. World 1989 (from Peru)
 Luis Uzcategui - Fashion Designer

Background Music

Opening Show – Miss Peru Anthem (composed by Coco Tafur)
Swimsuit Competition – Brainbug - "Nightmare"
Evening Gown Competition – Vangelis - "Conquest Of Paradise"

Special Guests Singers

 Jorge Pardo - "Al Final De Una Historia" & "Sin Ti"
 Ruth Karina - "Lloras Por Mi" & "Muevete"
 Rene & Renny - "Deshojo la Margarita"

References 

Miss Peru
2000 in Peru
2000 beauty pageants